Teracotona melanocera is a moth in the family Erebidae. It was described by George Hampson in 1920. It is found in Kenya, Tanzania and Uganda.

References

Moths described in 1920
Spilosomina